The 2018–19 Stony Brook Seawolves men's basketball team represented Stony Brook University in the 2018–19 NCAA Division I men's basketball season. They played their home games at the Island Federal Credit Union Arena in Stony Brook, New York and were led by third-year head coach Jeff Boals. The team won 24 regular season games, a school record as a Division I program, including a nation-leading 13 road wins and received the No. 2 seed in the America East tournament. However, they lost in the quarterfinals to Binghamton.

On March 17, 2019, Boals left the school to accept the head coaching position at his alma mater, Ohio. Assistant coach Geno Ford was named interim head coach of the team in the College Basketball Invitational tournament.

Previous season
The Seawolves finished the 2017–18 season 13–19, 7–9 in the America East Conference play to finish in fifth place. In the America East tournament, they upset Albany on the road before losing to Vermont in the semifinals. Freshman Elijah Olaniyi was named America East Rookie of the Year, while sophomore Akwasi Yeboah was named All-America East Second Team.

Roster

Season 
In their season opener at George Washington, Stony Brook fell behind 22–0 but rallied all the way back to force overtime and win, 77–74 in one of the largest comebacks in NCAA Division I history. The Seawolves then upset South Carolina to win their first game against an SEC opponent in program history. Stony Brook started 6–1 for the first time as a Division I program. Stony Brook won 12 non-conference games, a new school record as a Division I program. The team's seven true road wins led the nation.

In the America East regular season, the Seawolves began 5–0 in conference play, including a comeback against Maine that came after an 18–point deficit. They lost control of first place in the America East after a 72–53 defeat against Vermont at home. The conference regular-season title was on the line in Stony Brook's second matchup at Vermont in March, and after falling down by 13, a 20–2 Stony Brook run gave them the lead only to fall by a final score of 50–56. A 68–63 road victory at Hartford secured the No. 2 seed in the America East tournament for Stony Brook; a loss would have dropped them to fourth place.

In the quarterfinals of the America East tournament, Stony Brook played seventh-seeded Binghamton. In a stunning upset, the Seawolves fell down by 24 points in the second half but would have cut the deficit to one after a Jaron Cornish layup and foul. However, the call was reversed to an offensive foul, sending the deficit back to four and sending Stony Brook home in an improbable loss.

The Seawolves were invited to the 2019 College Basketball Invitational, where they travelled to Tampa to play South Florida. Although Stony Brook had a 25-point lead in the first half (48–23), they collapsed down the stretch and ultimately lost, 82–79, in overtime.

Schedule and results

|-
!colspan=9 style="background:#; color:white;"| Non-conference regular season

|-
!colspan=9 style="background:#; color:white;"| America East regular season

|-
!colspan=12 style=| America East tournament

|-
!colspan=9 style=| College Basketball Invitational

Source

References 

Stony Brook Seawolves men's basketball seasons
Stony Brook Seawolves
2018 in sports in New York (state)
Stony Brook